6 Feet Beneath the Moon is the debut studio album by English singer-songwriter Archy Marshall under the stage name King Krule. It was released on 24 August 2013, Marshall's nineteenth birthday, via True Panther Sounds and XL Recordings.

Release and promotion
6 Feet Beneath the Moon was released in North America by True Panther Sounds and in the rest of the world by XL Recordings. Zane Lowe of BBC Radio 1 premiered "Neptune Estate" on his show on 12 August 2013. On 14 August the album was made available to stream in full on King Krule's website, with live CCTV footage of various London streets accompanying each track.

Track listing

Sample credits
 "Will I Come" contains samples from The Wicker Man.
 "Bathed in Grey" contains elements and samples from "What Is There to Say", written by E. Y. Harburg and Vernon Duke and performed by Bill Evans.

Personnel
 Archy Marshall – performance, production
 Rodaidh McDonald – production, mixing, engineering
 Andy Ramsay – engineering 
 Desmond Lambert – engineering 
 Jack Marshall – illustration
 Reuben Bastienne-Lewis – photography

Charts

References

2013 debut albums
King Krule albums
XL Recordings albums
True Panther Sounds albums
Albums produced by Rodaidh McDonald